Robert Keeley is the name of:

Robert V. Keeley (1929–2015), former United States Ambassador to Greece, Zimbabwe, and Mauritius
Robert Keeley (comedian) (1793–1869), English comedian
Robert Keeley (instrument maker), American effects pedal producer

See also
Bob Keely (1909–2001), American baseball coach